The 30th Anniversary Celebration is a live EP by the American heavy metal band Metallica. It was recorded live on December 9 and 10, 2011, at Fillmore Theatre in San Francisco, California. Metallica celebrated its 30th anniversary by playing four shows there. The shows were exclusive only to Met Club members and tickets were charged at $6 (or $19.81 for all four nights). The shows consisted of songs spanning the band's entire career and included guest appearances by artists that either helped or influenced Metallica. Dave Mustaine, Jason Newsted, Glenn Danzig, Ozzy Osbourne, Jerry Cantrell, Rob Halford, Apocalyptica, members of Diamond Head and King Diamond join Metallica on stage for all appropriate songs.

Track listing

Personnel
 Kirk Hammett – lead guitar
 James Hetfield – vocals, rhythm guitar
 Lars Ulrich – drums
 Robert Trujillo – bass guitar

References

2012 EPs
Metallica live albums
Live EPs
2012 live albums
Warner Records EPs
Warner Records live albums
Metallica EPs